Kalikapur High School is a government-sponsored secondary school located in Contai, Purba Medinipur, West Bengal, India, near Contai Polytechnic College.

History
This school was established in 1961. The school is affiliated by the West Bengal Board of Secondary Education.

See also
Education in India
List of schools in India
Education in West Bengal

References 

Department of School Education, Government of West Bengal

External links
 Kalikapur High School at Facebook

High schools and secondary schools in West Bengal
Schools in Purba Medinipur district
Educational institutions established in 1961
1961 establishments in West Bengal